Sandra Nkaké (born 15 November 1973) is a French-Cameroonian actress and singer.

Biography
Nkaké was born in Yaoundé, Cameroon in 1973. At the age of 12, she moved to France. Nkaké was passionate about music from an early age, particularly Prince whom she discovered as a teenager. However, she desired to become an English teacher and studied in Paris at the Sorbonne. When she was 20, she turned her attention towards the theater, auditioning for a role and becoming an actress. Nkaké made her debut in The Crucible in 1994, directed by Thomas Ledouarec. The following year, she had a role in Le Dindon.

Nkaké made her film debut in Les Deux Papas et la Maman in 1996, directed by Jean-Marc Longval. Several films and TV films followed, but Nkaké remained focused on her music career as well. In 1996, she participated in the Ollano trip-hop project alongside Hélène Noguerra. During the 2000s, Nkaké collaborated in the studio and on stage with several artists, such as Jacques Higelin, Daniel Yvinec and the National Jazz Orchestra, Julien Lourau, and Rodolphe Burger. She worked with Gerald Toto and David Walters for the Urban Kreol project.

In 2008, Nkaké released her debut album Mansaadi, supporting the record with over 200 concerts around the world, including tours in Africa and Brazil. She recorded a tribute to Donny Hathaway on Stéphane Belmondo's 2011 album Ever After. In 2012 her second album Nothing for Granted came out, which was co-written with her associate Ji Drû. This album was released on Jazz Village record label. Nkaké's expressive voice made her a staple on the French soul scene. She received the Frank Ténot prize at the Victoires du Jazz ceremony in July 2012. In September 2017, she released her third album Tangerine Moon Wishes, which she considered her most personal record.

Since 2007, she has lived in the Paris suburb of Saint-Denis, Seine-Saint-Denis.

Discography
2008 : Mansaadi (Cornershop/Naïve)
2012 : Nothing For Granted (Jazz Village/Harmonia Mundi)
2017 : Tangerine Moon Wishes (Jazz Village)

Filmography
1996 : Les Deux Papas et la Maman
2000 : The Girl
2003 : Bienvenue au gîte
2004 : Casablanca Driver
2009 : King Guillaume
2011 : Toi, moi, les autres
2014 : Not My Type
2015 : Mes chers disparus (TV series) : Brigitte Elbert
2016 : Bienvenue au Gondwana
2017 : La Fin De La Nuit : Nanda
2017 : Une saison en France
2018 : Photo de Famille

References

External links
Sandra Nkaké at the Internet Movie Database
Official website

1973 births
Living people
Cameroonian actresses
21st-century Cameroonian women singers
People from Yaoundé